KDRA-LP (94.1 FM) was a radio station licensed to Des Moines, Iowa, United States and adopted the nickname "The Dog" on August 22, 2006. The station was last owned by Drake University.

History
Drake first began radio operations in 1982, with carrier current station "KDRK". From 2000 to 2006, it broadcast online and on campus TV sets as "KDCS Bulldog Radio". Until 2015, it was a time-shared station with KGVC-LP of Grand View College, later Grand View University; when the license for KGVC-LP was surrendered, it allowed KDRA-LP to go full-time on 94.1. On June 10, 2019, Drake University notified the FCC that KDRA-LP would cease operations on or before August 15, 2019, and that it would be surrendering the station's license. Its license was cancelled on January 5, 2021.

References

DRA-LP
DRA-LP
DRA-LP
Radio stations established in 2006
2006 establishments in Iowa
Drake University
2021 disestablishments in Iowa
Defunct radio stations in the United States
Defunct mass media in Iowa
Radio stations disestablished in 2021